Joba Majhi is an Indian politician. She was elected to the Jharkhand Legislative Assembly from Manoharpur in the 2014 Jharkhand Legislative Assembly election as a member of the Jharkhand Mukti Morcha. She was sworn in as Minister of Social Welfare, Women and Child Development and Tourism in First Arjun Munda cabinet from March 2003 to March 2005 as member of United Goans Democratic Party as well as she was minister in Babulal Marandi cabinet from November 2000 to March 2003. She was wife of Devendra Majhi a leader of Singhbhum's Jungle Andolan.

References

Living people
State cabinet ministers of Jharkhand
People from West Singhbhum district
1960 births
Members of the Jharkhand Legislative Assembly
Jharkhand Mukti Morcha politicians
United Goans Democratic Party politicians